The Complaints Against Police Office (CAPO) is a unit within the Hong Kong Police Force that handles complaints against the force's officers. The Office is part of the Complaints and Internal Investigations Branch of the force's Service Quality Wing.

All reviews conducted by CAPO are monitored by the Independent Police Complaints Council (IPCC).

In 2006 to 2008, 325 police officers were disciplined on substantiation of the complaints against them.  Of these, 292 were given advice, 12 given warnings, 12 cautioned, two reprimanded, six severely reprimanded and one dismissed subsequent to criminal conviction.

There have been criticisms that CAPO lacks credibility and transparency in handling complaints against the police, and also that the IPCC has limited monitoring power.

References

Hong Kong Government
Hong Kong government departments and agencies
Hong Kong Police Force